Georgia selected their Junior Eurovision Song Contest 2012 entry through an internal selection for the first time. Georgian Public Broadcaster (GPB) was responsible for organising their entry for the contest. On 10 October 2012 it was revealed that the Funkids would represent Georgia in the contest with the song "Funky Lemonade".

Background

Prior to the 2012 contest, Georgia had participated in the Junior Eurovision Song Contest five times since its début in 2007.

Before Junior Eurovision
For the first time since their début in the contest, the Georgian broadcaster GPB decided select their 2012 artist internally. GPB selected the Funkids to represent Georgia in Amsterdam. Originally, Georgia was to select a song for the Funkids through a national selection process, however this was cancelled due to the GPB's desire to focus on the Georgian parliamentary election. Instead, on 10 October 2012, it was revealed that the Funkids were to perform the song "Funky Lemonade".

Artist and song information

The Funkids
The Funkids are a Georgian band who represented Georgia in the Junior Eurovision Song Contest 2012 with their song "Funky Lemonade" which came second with a total of 103 points. They consist of Ketevan Samkharadze, Nino Dashniani, Luka Karmazanashvili and Elene Arachashvili.

Funky Lemonade
"Funky Lemonade" is a song by Georgian band The Funkids. It represented Georgia during the Junior Eurovision Song Contest 2012. It is composed and written by Giga Kukhianidze and Nana Tstintsadze with help from the Funkids themselves.

At Junior Eurovision
At the running order draw which took place on 15 October 2012, Georgia were drawn to perform tenth on 1 December 2012, following  and preceding .

Final
Ketevan, Nino and Elene lined up on stage behind Luka who showcased a variety of dances in front of them. The background featured a rotating bottle of lemonade.

Voting

Notes

References

Junior Eurovision Song Contest
Georgia (country)
2012